The 2021–22 Duquesne Dukes men's basketball team represented Duquesne University during the 2021–22 NCAA Division I men's basketball season. The team were led by fifth-year head coach Keith Dambrot, and played their home games at the UPMC Cooper Fieldhouse in Pittsburgh, Pennsylvania as a member of the Atlantic 10 Conference.

Previous season
In a season limited due to the ongoing COVID-19 pandemic, the Dukes finished the 2020–21 season 9–9, 7–7 in A-10 play to finish in ninth place. In the A-10 tournament they defeated to Richmond in the second round before losing to St. Bonaventure in the quarterfinals.

Offseason

Departures

Incoming transfers

2021 recruiting class

Roster

Schedule and results

|-
!colspan=12 style=| Non-conference regular season

|-
!colspan=12 style=| Atlantic 10 regular season

|-
!colspan=12 style=| A-10 tournament

Source

References

Duquesne Dukes men's basketball seasons
Duquesne Dukes
Duquesne Dukes men's basketball
Duquesne Dukes men's basketball